A Love So Beautiful is a compilation album by American singer Roy Orbison. It was released on November 3, 2017 by Roy's Boys, Monument, Legacy, Sony. The album features archival vocal recordings of Orbison accompanied by new orchestral arrangements by the Royal Philharmonic Orchestra. It also features a duet with English country duo Ward Thomas.

A Love So Beautiful debuted and peaked at number 2 on the UK Albums Chart, becoming Orbison's highest charting album for almost 30 years.

"Oh, Pretty Woman" opens with a guitar strum played by Orbison's grandson Roy III, then aged about ten months.

Track listing

Charts and certifications

Charts

Certifications

References

2017 compilation albums
Roy Orbison compilation albums
Orchestral pop albums
Royal Philharmonic Orchestra albums
Monument Records compilation albums
Legacy Recordings compilation albums